Gilbert Claude Vassall (5 April 1876 – 19 September 1941) played first-class cricket for Somerset in six matches between 1902 and 1905. He was born at Hardington Mandeville, Somerset and died at Oxford.

Vassall was the son of the rector of Hardington Mandeville. He was educated at Charterhouse School and at Oriel College, Oxford and he played cricket for his college but not for the university side. His fame at Oxford was as a long jumper, and he was the champion for three consecutive years from 1897 to 1899 in the Varsity athletic match against Cambridge University, his jump of 23 feet and three inches in 1899 being only two inches short of the then record, held by C. B. Fry.

On leaving the university, Vassall became a schoolmaster at the Dragon School in Oxford, remaining there until his death, by which time he was joint headmaster. In the school holidays in 1902, 1903 and 1905, he played a few cricket matches for Somerset as a lower-order batsman and right-arm fast bowler. In his first game, against Surrey, he joined Peter Randall Johnson with Somerset needing 65 for victory with three wickets to fall and hit an unbeaten 27 to take his side to success. But in his five other matches for Somerset over the next three years he only made 19 other runs and his only wicket came in 1905 when, as the seventh bowler used, he finally broke a stand of 261 by the Kent second wicket pair Ted Dillon and James Seymour.

References

1876 births
1941 deaths
English cricketers
English footballers
Somerset cricketers
People educated at Charterhouse School
Alumni of Oriel College, Oxford
Oxford University A.F.C. players
Corinthian F.C. players
Yeovil Town F.C. players
Association footballers not categorized by position